Ernesto Luis Muyshondt García–Prieto  (born 30 August 1975 San Salvador), is a Salvadoran businessman, politician and member of the Nationalist Republican Alliance (ARENA) party. He served as the Mayor of San Salvador, the capital and largest city in El Salvador, from 2018 to 2021. He was previously a deputy of the Legislative Assembly of El Salvador from 2015 until 2018.

Biography 

In 2017, incumbent San Salvador Mayor Nayib Bukele was expelled from the Farabundo Martí National Liberation Front (FMLN) party. In response, Bukele announced that he would seek a new political party and run for president in the 2019 Salvadoran presidential election. The political upheaval came less than six months before the 2018 Salvadoran municipal elections, when voters would choose a new Mayor of San Salvador.

The right-wing Nationalist Republican Alliance (ARENA) selected Ernesto Muyshondt, a deputy in the Legislative Assembly, as its candidate. The ruling FMLN, which had held the mayor's office until it expelled Bukele from the party, chose Jackeline Rivera, a National Assembly deputy from Cuscatlán and former child soldier during the Salvadoran Civil War, as its candidate for mayor. Observers believed that Muyshondt had the edge in the race. Muyshondt easily defeated Rivera in the mayoral election on 4 March 2018. Muyshondt received 88,194 votes, or 61.2%, while Rivera placed a distant second with 39,736 votes, or 27.61%.

Muyshondt was inaugurated as Mayor of San Salvador on 1 May 2018.

In the legislative elections, held in February 2021, Muyshondt lost re-election for the Mayor of San Salvador against the candidate of Nuevas Ideas, Mario Durán. On 4 June 2021, he was placed under house arrest on suspicions of electoral fraud and illegal negotiations with gangs. He was hospitalized in January 2023 following a "prolonged hunger strike".

References 

Living people
1975 births
Mayors of San Salvador
Members of the Legislative Assembly of El Salvador
Nationalist Republican Alliance politicians